, provisional designation:  and cometary designation , is an asteroid and main-belt comet from the outer regions of the asteroid belt, approximately  in diameter. It was discovered on 31 January 2003, by astronomers of the LONEOS program conducted at Anderson Mesa Station near Flagstaff, Arizona, in the United States.

Orbit and classification 

 is a main-belt comet with a Jupiter Tisserand's parameter of 2.99. It orbits the Sun in the outer asteroid belt at a distance of 3.4–5.1 AU once every 8 years and 9 months (3,199 days; semi-major axis of 4.25 AU). Its orbit has an eccentricity of 0.19 and an inclination of 6° with respect to the ecliptic.

The body's observation arc begins with its first precovery observation by the NEAT program in December 2001, more than a year prior to its official discovery observation at Anderson Mesa.

In 2022 a team from Northern Arizona University determined that  is a Quasi-Hilda Object with a sustained activity outburst, lasting over 15 months. Their dynamical simulations showed that this object has undergone at least five close encounters with Jupiter and one with Saturn over the last 180 years. It was likely a Centaur or Jupiter family comet 250 years ago. In the future this object will have about 15 strong interactions with Jupiter and 380 years in the future it might become again a Jupiter family comet. But it could also become a main-belt asteroid.

Numbering and naming 

This minor planet was numbered by the Minor Planet Center on 6 April 2012. , it has not been named.

Physical characteristics 

Based on a generic magnitude-to-diameter conversion,  measures approximately 4.4 kilometers in diameter using an absolute magnitude of 15.3 and an estimated albedo 0.07, typical for rather dark cometary-like bodies.

, no rotational lightcurve of  has been obtained from photometric observations. The body's rotation period, shape and spin axis remain unknown.

References

External links 
 282P/(323137) 2003 BM80 (2021), MISAO project, Seiichi Yoshida
 Asteroid Lightcurve Database (LCDB), query form (simple query)
 Dictionary of Minor Planet Names, Google books
 Discovery Circumstances: Numbered Minor Planets (320001)-(325000) – Minor Planet Center
 
 

323137
0282
323137
20030131